

Results
Arsenal's score comes first

Football League Second Division

Final League table

FA Cup

References

1898-99
English football clubs 1898–99 season